Ukrainian Gothic Portal (Український Готичний Портал, UGP) is a printed magazine, web-portal and promotion agency of gothic / dark / electro scene in Ukraine, Russia and Belarus. UGP was established in 1999 on basis of unofficial closed subculture formation Kiev Gothic Clan (KGC) and was officially registered in 2000 on the domain gothic.com.ua. The founder and ideologist of UGP was the author of gothic-related publications, Vitaliy Stranger. In 2000–2005, UGP became one of the leading dark music-related agencies in Ukraine and Russia, covered by local and international press, organizing festival "Deti Nochi: Chorna Rada", publishing printed magazine "Gothica", releasing cds on label "Tridens", making its own radio program and TV appearances. Cooperation partners of UGP became such festivals as Wave-Gotik-Treffen, Castle Party, such magazines as Zillo, Orkus and other organizations in Europe. The aims of UGP were the creation, development and coverage of gothic / dark / electro scene in Ukraine and in all countries of ex-USSR as well as uniting scene-fans and admirers of respective aesthetics.

Among the most famous projects of UGP has to be mentioned the establishment of the festival  (2000), label Tridens Records (2003) and printed magazine "Gothica" (2006):
 Festival  is gothic/dark/electro event in Ukraine, Russia, Belarus and other countries of ex-USSR
 Label  Tridens Records is gothic/dark/electro studio in Ukraine
 Printed magazine Gothica is Russian-speaking music magazine

Since 1999 the numerous projects had been launched for the achievement of assigned aims. UGP conducted following functions: 
 As a multifunctional online portal gothic.com.ua it developed informational and news resources (publication of materials, reportages and photo galleries from  various events in Ukraine, Russia, Belarus, Germany, Poland etc.), started  specialized sections (“Music”, “Cinema”, “Literature”, “Architecture”, “Photo”, “Art”, “Translations”), designed sites of bands (Komu Vnyz, Fleur, Holodne Sonze etc.) and official Russian-language sites of festivals  (Wave-Gotik-Treffen, M’era Luna, Castle Party), and also began to create and manage interactive services (GothicJournal, GothicGallery, BlackPages).
 Being a management, production and booking agency, it supported various bands, among them are  Komu Vnyz, Flëur, Dust Heaven, Holodne Sonze.
 UGP organized more than 20 performances of bands and Djs, whom it supports, in Europe, Ukraine and CIS at the international festivals: Wave-Gotik-Treffen (2002, 2004, 2007), Castle Party (2001, 2005, 2007, 2008, 2009), Prague in Dark (2006), Electro Prague (2007). In 2010 UGP started to work with Russian band Otto Dix and organized their concert on Castle Party 2010.
 As an organizer of the concerts in Ukraine, UGP organized the concerts Diary of Dreams (Germany), Deutsch Nepal (Sweden ) and other international and domestic bands.
 It also began to issue and license the material of supported bands in Germany and Poland for such compilations as "Gotham", "Dark East", "Castle Party" and also helped bands to take part in remix-contests: Gray/scale for Wumpscut, Funker Vogt, Agonized by Love, Deathcamp Project, Holodne Sonze  for L'Âme Immortelle.

As achievement of UGP, praised by local Ukrainian press, can be stated the organization of the concerts of three Ukrainian bands (Komu Vnyz, Dust Heaven, Grayscale) at festival Wave-Gotik-Treffen at once in both 2004 and 2007.

At the present team of UGP continues to increase its activity in Ukraine, Russia and Belarus as well as in other European countries and works on one more book about gothic-scene in ex-USSR and Europe.

Notes

References 
 Article about history and development of Ukrainian gothic/dark scene "Men in black" in business weekly magazine "Power of society" (No. 51, September 2005), author: Olga Volodchenko
 Article "Gothic for the masses" in "Highway" online-magazine (h.ua), author: Olga Volodchenko
 Article "Goths" in weekly "Afisha" (No. 21, 30.05 - 05.06, 2005) (gotic.org.ua) (gothic.org.ua)
 Article "Notes for the goths: Deti Nochi 4" in magazine "Hammer" (No. 17, 2007) (gotic.org.ua), author: Oleksandra Vasylchuk
 Article "Ukrainian goths celebrated the night" in magazine "Review" (25.04.2007) (gothic.org.ua), author: Efim Alexandrov
 Article "Goths between us" in magazine "Everning news" (No. 196, 25.12.2003) (gothic.com.ua), author: Alexander Evtushenko
 Article about Ukrainian gothic scene "Vitaliy aus Kiew denkt duester" and biography of Vitaliy Stranger in German magazine "Leipziger Volskszeitung" (No. 196, 25.12.2003) (gothic.com.ua), author: Eddie Stein
 Article "Gothic in Ukraine: For those who's going down and those who need cold sun", magazine "R.I.P." (No.1, June/July 2005) (restinpeace.spb.ru), author: Olga Safina
 Interview "Ideologist of ukrainian gothic Vitaliy Stranger: Dark angel with axe protects Ukraine" in political magazine "Ukrainian truth" (No. 196, 29.08.2004) (pravda.com.ua), author: Nasty Snezhnaja
 Interview "Ukrainian gothic is a power of spirit" in literature digest "Ukrainian word" (No. 13, 27.02 - 04.03, 2003) (gothic.com.ua), author: Nasty Snezhnaja
 Article and interview "Men in black" in weekly "Afisha" (No. 42, 25.10 - 10.11, 2003) (gothic.com.ua)

External links

Official site of festival "Deti Nochi: Chorna Rada"
Official site of magazine "Gothica"
Official site of label "Tridens"

1999 establishments in Ukraine
Magazines established in 1999
Magazines published in Ukraine
Music magazines
Multilingual magazines